National Route 115 is a national highway of Japan connecting Sōma, Fukushima and Inawashiro, Fukushima in Japan, with a total length of 109.7 km (68.16 mi).

History
Route 115 was originally designated on 1 April 1953 from Hirashima to Niigata. This was redesignated as Route 49 on 1 April 1963 and the current Route 115 was designated the same day.

See also

References

External links

115
Roads in Fukushima Prefecture